Mel Tyrae Owens (born December 7, 1958) is a former American football linebacker. He played college football at the University of Michigan from 1977 to 1980. He was selected by the Los Angeles Rams in the first round (ninth overall pick) of the 1981 NFL Draft. He played nine seasons as a linebacker in the National Football League (NFL), all with the Rams. He compiled 26.5 quarterback sacks.

Early years
Owens was born in Detroit, Michigan, in 1958.  He attended DeKalb High School in DeKalb, Illinois.

University of Michigan 
Owens enrolled at the University of Michigan in 1976.  He played college football for Bo Schembechler's Michigan Wolverines football teams from 1977 to 1980. As a redshirt freshman and sophomore, he started a total of three games for the 1977 and 1978 Michigan Wolverines football teams. He was injured in 1978 versus Notre Dame.

Owens emerged as a starter in all 12 games for the 1979 Michigan Wolverines football team. That year, he had 42 tackles and 26 assists.

As a senior, Owens started 11 of 12 games at outside linebacker for the 1980 Michigan Wolverines football team that compiled a 10-2 record, finished #4 in the AP and UPI polls, and outscored opponents 322 to 129.  During the 1980 season, Owens tallied 52 tackles, 37 assists, and an interception. He was selected as a first-team All-Big Ten Conference player in 1980.

Owens concluded his collegiate career with 125 tackles, 79 assists, and three interceptions. He played in the 1978 and 1981 Rose Bowls and the 1979 Gator Bowl while at Michigan. He graduated with a bachelor's degree in political science.

Los Angeles Rams 
The Los Angeles Rams selected Owens with the ninth overall pick in the 1981 NFL Draft.  After a brief holdout, Owens in late July 1981 signed a series of three one-year contracts with the Rams. His reported time in the 40-yard dash was 4.65, and his bench press was 390 pounds.

He played mostly on special teams in 1981 and 1982. He made his first start against the Los Angeles Raiders in the second-to-last game of the 1982 NFL season in which he recorded 10 tackles before leaving the game with a knee injury. The injury caused him to miss the last two weeks of the season. Owens became a full-time starter in 1983, when the Rams switched to a 3-4 defense.  That season, he was fifth on the Rams defense with 83 tackles. He also had four sacks. In 1984, he was third in tackles with 79 and 3.5 sacks and an interception along with three fumbles recovered and a forced fumble. The following season, 1985, he was sixth in tackles with 68 (five for a loss) and also contributed nine sacks, third on the team. In 1986, Owens was an honorable mention All-Pro by the Associated Press as the Rams defense ranked in the NFL's top five for the second consecutive season. In the third week of the 1986 season, Owens was named the NFC Defensive Player of the Week by the NFL.

Owens started every non-strike game from 1983 through 1987. In 1988, he suffered an ankle injury that limited him to seven games (four starts). In 1989, he was switched to inside linebacker, after spending his entire NFL career at strong outside linebacker. He played all 16 games with 10 starts. Owens totaled 453 tackles with 26.5 sacks in his Ram career with four interceptions.

Personal and post-football career 
Owens was involved in several business ventures in Los Angeles, including a line of clothing called "Evolution Wear". He also operated a nationwide restaurant reservation hotline in the 1980s called 1-800-LETS-EAT. He traveled to Egypt in the 1984 off-season. In 1987, he ran with the bulls in Pamplona, Spain, in the 1987 off-season and also competed in the 1987 Los Angeles Marathon.

Following his time as an NFL player, Owens obtained a Series 7 License and worked as a financial advisor at Merrill Lynch.  He later attended University of California, Hastings College of the Law and was admitted to the California bar in 2003. In 2006, he became a founding partner of Namanny, Byrne & Owens in Laguna Hills, California.  He specializes in workers' compensation, sports law, sports injuries and disability benefits.

References

1958 births
Living people
People from DeKalb, Illinois
American football linebackers
Michigan Wolverines football players
Los Angeles Rams players
University of California, Hastings College of the Law alumni
Players of American football from Illinois
Players of American football from Detroit